Sowmaeh-ye Sofla may refer to:
 Sowmaeh-ye Sofla, Maragheh
 Sowmaeh-ye Sofla, Meyaneh